Nora Tallus, previously Liikanen, (born 9 February 1981) is a Finnish retired ice hockey forward, currently serving as assistant coach to KJT Haukat of the Naisten Mestis. She represented  in the women's ice hockey tournament at the 2006 Winter Olympics and in four IIHF World Women's Championships, with bronze medals won in the 2004 and 2008 tournaments.

Tallus attended University of Minnesota Duluth (UMD) from 2001 to 2005 where she played with the Bulldogs ice hockey team. With the Bulldogs, she was a NCAA Division I National Champion in 2002 and 2003. In the 2003 tournament, Tallus scored the championship winning goal 4:16 into second overtime against Harvard.

References

External links
 

1981 births
Living people
People from Kerava
Finnish women's ice hockey forwards
HPK Kiekkonaiset players
Minnesota Duluth Bulldogs women's ice hockey players
Olympic ice hockey players of Finland
Ice hockey players at the 2006 Winter Olympics
Keravan Shakers players
IHK Naiset players
Sportspeople from Uusimaa